Bunovo is a village in Kyustendil Municipality, Kyustendil Province, south-western Bulgaria.

Honours
Bunovo Peak on Fallières Coast, Antarctica is named after the village.

References

Villages in Kyustendil Province